Franzel Julio September (born 6 June 1986) is a South African professional rugby union player, currently playing with the . His regular position is flanker.

Career

Youth and Amateur rugby

September played some youth rugby for his provincial side, Boland. He represented their Under-18 side at the 2004 Academy Week competition and their Under-19 in the 2005 Under-19 Provincial Championship. However, he failed to make the breakthrough to the senior side and instead played club rugby for Roses United, also representing them at the National Club Championships in 2006.

SWD Eagles

However, that also turned out to be his only playing time in the competition, failing to come on as a substitute in the other two matches that he was named on the replacement bench.

Boland Cavaliers

He returned to the Boland and played some rugby for their amateur side in the latter part of 2009. His first senior start came during the 2010 Vodacom Cup competition, starting in their match against  and scoring two tries in the first half to help his side to a 37–28 victory. In addition to the two tries in his first match, September contributed a further two tries during the competition to end just one behind the Cavaliers' top try scorer, Willie le Roux.

He also found himself included in their Currie Cup squad and made ten starts in their 2010 Currie Cup First Division campaign as they finished third on the log, scoring three tries in the process.

He made a further eight appearances during the 2011 Vodacom Cup competition, but he tore some ligaments in his left knee during the 2011 Currie Cup First Division season, restricting him to just two appearances.

September started 18 of Boland's matches during the 2013 Vodacom Cup and Currie Cup seasons, contributing a further four tries.

References

South African rugby union players
Living people
1986 births
Sportspeople from Paarl
Rugby union flankers
Boland Cavaliers players
SWD Eagles players
Rugby union players from the Western Cape